The 1979 KFK competitions in Ukraine were part of the 1979 Soviet KFK football competitions that were conducted in the Soviet Union. It was 15th season of the KFK in Ukraine since its introduction in 1964. The winner eventually qualified to the 1980 Soviet Second League.

First stage

Group 1

Group 2

Group 3

Group 4

Group 5

Group 6

Final

References

Ukrainian Football Amateur League seasons
KFK